Apna Desh is a 1972 Indian Hindi-language action drama film, produced by A.V. Subramaniam and T.M.Kittu and directed by Jambu. The film stars Rajesh Khanna, Mumtaz, Om Prakash, Jagdeep, Mukkamala, Madan Puri and the credited Roja Ramani, who plays Rajesh Khanna's niece Sharda. The soundtrack is composed by R. D. Burman. 

The film is a remake of the 1969 Telugu film Kathanayakudu. The child chorus for the song "Rona Kabhi Nahi Rona" was done by Sandhya Pandit and Vijeyta Pandit, who are elder sisters of music directors Jatin-Lalit.

Plot
Akash is an honest and educated young man, employed by the Bombay Municipal Corporation as a clerk. He lives with his equally honest brother Dinanath, his sister-in-law, a niece, Sharda and a nephew. Due to Akash's honesty, he becomes a liability to his corrupt superiors. Dharmdas tries to bribe Akash but Akash denied it to do so. Chanda is in love with Akash and Akash also knows it and both agree to it. Dharamdas plans to give Money to Dinanath to deposit in the bank and told his assistant that on the way, he will send goons to snatch money from Dinanath and make him guilty. But Dinanath discovers this plan and takes money from the locker and runs away. Dharamdas learns about the money stealing. One day, they find fault with his work and arrange a board meeting. In the board meeting, people accuses Akash for demanding bribe from Dharamdas and take voting in which people voted to remove Akash from the position and dismiss him. Akash outsmarts Dharamdas in bidding. Akash takes the help of Alibaba to bluff Dharamdas and team. When Akash attempts to assert himself legally, he finds that there is corruption everywhere. In retaliation, even his brother is implicated in a crime, and arrested. Now, Akash must come up with a way to clear his brother, as well as expose the wrong-doers.

Cast
 Rajesh Khanna as Akash Chandra
 Mumtaz as Chanda / Madame Popololita
 Om Prakash as Dharmadas
 Jagdeep as Shambhu / Ali Baba
 Kanhaiyalal as Sevaram
 Madan Puri as Satyanarayan
 Manmohan Krishna as Dinath Chandra
 Mukkamala as Mrs. Dinath Chandra
 Rajan Haksar
 Satyendra Kapoor

Soundtrack

References

External links 
 

Hindi remakes of Telugu films
Indian action drama films
Films scored by R. D. Burman
1972 films
1970s Hindi-language films
Fictional portrayals of police departments in India